Hinwood is surname. Notable people with the surname include:

 Bonaventure Hinwood (1930–2016), South African priest and poet
 John Hinwood (1894–1971), English cricketer
 Peter Hinwood (born 1946), English actor
 Rhyl Hinwood (born 1940), Australian sculptor